The Theban tomb TT29 is located in Sheikh Abd el-Qurna, part of the Theban Necropolis, on the west bank of the Nile, opposite to Luxor. It is the burial place of the ancient Egyptian noble Amenemopet called Pairy who was vizier and governor of Thebes.

Amenemopet called Pairy was the son of Ahmose Humay (TT224) and Nub. His wife was called Weretmaatef. Amenemopet called Pairy was the cousin of Sennefer (TT96), and he had a son named Paser.

In the hall of the tomb six scenes are shown:
 Amenemopet and his wife make offerings before the god Ra
 Amenemopet offers to the ka of Amenhotep II
 Texts detailing the duties of the vizier
 Amenemopet is shown passing judgement as vizier.

The other two scenes contain more texts.

In the passage connected to the hall offerings to Amenemopet and his family are shown. He is depicted with his parents, his cousin Sennefer and his cousin's wife Senetnay, and his son Paser.

See also
 List of Theban tombs
 N. de Garis Davies, Nina and Norman de Garis Davies, Egyptologists

References

External links
Scans of Norman and Nina De Garis Davies' tracings from Theban Tomb 29 (external).

Theban tombs